USS YF-854 was an American YF-852-class covered lighter built in 1945. She was later commissioned by the United States Navy and renamed USS Littlehales (AGSC-15) in 1959, serving as a coastal survey ship. 

The ship is named after an American oceanographer George Washington Littlehales, an American chairman of the Section of Physical Oceanography, American Geophysical Union, and as vice president of the Section of Oceanography, International Union of Geodesy and Geophysics.

Awards 

 National Defense Service Medal

References

External links 

 NavSource Online: Littlehales (AGSC-15)
 NavSite: USS Littlehales (AGSC 15) Crew List
 TogetherWeServed: Littlehales Crew Members

Survey ships of the United States
1945 ships
Ships built in Erie, Pennsylvania
Cold War auxiliary ships of the United States